Tiago Mayan Gonçalves (born 5 March 1977) is a Portuguese politician who represents Liberal Initiative.

Background and personal life 
Mayan was born in Porto, on 5 March 1977. By profession, he is a lawyer and studied at Catholic University of Portugal. He is a son of a couple of chemical engineers. His father worked in business management, and his mother was a researcher and teacher.

In his free time, Mayan has been volunteering at Reefood since 2014. He is also an avid sailor.

Political career 
Mayan was one of the founders of Liberal Initiative.

In the 2021 Presidential election Mayan received 134,484 votes (3.22 %).

In that year's local elections, he was elected President of the Parish of Aldoar, Foz do Douro e Nevogilde, in Porto, as a part of Rui Moreira's independent movement.

References 

1977 births
Living people
Portuguese politicians
21st-century Portuguese lawyers
People from Porto
Candidates for President of Portugal
Catholic University of Portugal alumni
Liberal Initiative people